See also 1691 in piracy, other events in 1692, 1693 in piracy, and Timeline of piracy.

Events

Caribbean
June 7 - An earthquake and resulting tsunami devastate Port Royal, Jamaica, a major buccaneer base.

North America
December - Thomas Tew obtains letter of marque from governor of Bermuda.

Births
 Ingela Gathenhielm

Deaths

Piracy
Piracy by year